The  is an electric multiple unit (EMU) train type operated by the private railway operator Kintetsu Railway since 1964 on many of its commuter lines in the Kansai area of Japan.

Design 
First introduced in 1964, the design is based on the Kintetsu 900 series commuter train, also manufactured by Kinki Sharyo. All trainsets run on standard gauge  tracks.

At the time of introduction, the 8000 series and its sub-variants were the most common type found on the railway at 355 cars produced.

Variants 

 8000 series: 2-car and 4-car sets primarily used on the Nara Line
 8400 series: 2-car, 3-car and 4-car sets primarily used on the Nara Line with various improvements from the base model
 8600 series: 4-car sets primarily used on the Nara Line with upgraded cooling systems
 8800 series: 4-car sets primarily used on the Nara Line designated as test units for regenerative braking

8000 series 

The 8000 series is the base variant in the 8000 series family. 

Set 8059 was involved in the 1972 Nara Line bombing incident.  Afterwards, the cars were reincorporated into different trainsets by 1976.

Formations 
The 4-car sets are formed as follows.

The 3-car sets are formed as follows.

Past formations 
Until 2004 and for a brief while in 2014, the series was formed into some two-car trainsets.

In 1968, one four-car set, (#8069) and one two-car set (#8074) were combined into a 6-car train as an aluminum prototype. The set was scrapped in 2005.

Interior 
Seating consists of longitudinal seating throughout.

Disposal 
Scrapping began in 1997 with eight sets, with more sets gradually undergoing disposal until 2004.

As of 1 April 2019, two 3-car sets and 7 4-car sets remain in service. No two-car sets remain.

8400 series 

The 8400 series are 8000 series sets with modifications to the location of various onboard equipment. The three-car sets are re-fitted for wanman driver-only operation.

Formations 
The 4-car sets are formed as follows.

The 3-car sets are formed as follows.

Past formations 
Until 2014, there was a lone two-car trainset.

Interior 
Seating consists of longitudinal seating throughout.

Disposal 
Scrapping began in 2004 with set 8401, with more sets gradually undergoing disposal through 2019.

As of April 1, 2019, 45 of 80 cars, consisting of seven 3-car sets and six 4-car sets, remain in service. The sole 2-car set was withdrawn and scrapped in 2014.

Gallery

8600 series 

The 8600 series started appearing in 1973.

Formations 
The four-car sets are formed as follows.

The four-car sets involved in field phase control are formed as follows.

The lone six-car set is formed as follows.

Interior 
Seating consists of longitudinal seating throughout.

Gallery

8800 series 

This sub-series features regenerative braking.

Formations

Interior 
Seating consists of longitudinal seating throughout.

Gallery

References 

Electric multiple units of Japan
8000 series

Kinki Sharyo multiple units
1500 V DC multiple units of Japan